Labdia citracma is a moth of the family Cosmopterigidae. It is found in Taiwan, Japan, India and China. It has also been recorded from the Democratic Republic of Congo.

The wingspan is 10–15 mm.

The larvae feed on Theobroma cacao.

References

Moths described in 1915
Labdia
Moths of Asia
Moths of Japan
Moths of Taiwan